Xiao Jia, known professionally as Jony J, is a Chinese rapper and songwriter. Born and raised in Fuzhou, China, he debuted his rapping career through releasing a mixtape in 2013. In 2016, he founded his record label Shooc Studio and released his debut studio album. In 2017, he took part in the Chinese competition show, The Rap of China, and won fourth place. In 2020, he served as a rap mentor on the Chinese girl group survival reality show, Youth with You (season 2).

Life and career 
Jony J was born in Fuzhou in 1989 and then moved to Yancheng. In 2006, he attended Nanjing Institute of Visual Arts. During the college period, he signed a temporary contract with a record label and became a pub singer to perform in various cities during the probationary period, but later he declined to sign the formal contract.

In 2013, he released his first mixtape, J Hood. From May to June 2013, he embarked a pub concert tour in 11 cities. In 2015, he released an EP, Team Work. In 2016, he founded his record label Shooc Studio and released his first studio album, Wu Nv Jin. From October to December 2016, he embarked another pub concert tour in 15 cities. In 2017, he won Most Popular Rapper at the 6th HipHop Awards China. In the same year, he took part in the Chinese rapping competition show, The Rap of China, and achieved the fourth place. In the same year, he held his first arena concert in Nanjing. In 2020, he served as a rap mentor at the Chinese girl group survival reality show Youth with You (season 2). In the same year, he collaborated with Taiwanese singer Jolin Tsai on the theme song, "Who Am I", of the Chinese TV series, The Wolf.

References 

1989 births
21st-century Chinese musicians
21st-century rappers
Chinese male rappers
Chinese songwriters
Living people
People from Fuzhou
21st-century male musicians